

Mount Monster Conservation Park  is a protected area in the Australian state of South Australia located in the state’s south-east in the gazetted locality of  Keith about  south-east of the state capital of Adelaide and about  south of the town centre in Keith.

The conservation park consists of land in sections 478 and 499 and in Allotment 11 of Deposited Plan 13037 all located within the cadastral unit of the Hundred of Stirling. It is located to the west of Riddoch Highway.

The conservation park was proclaimed under the National Parks and Wildlife Act 1972 on 30 September 1976 in respect to section 478 which was gifted to the state government by three surrounding land owners. Section 499 and Allotment 11 being added by proclamation on 18 February 2010. A separate proclamation made on 18 February 2010 ensured the preservation of access permitted under the state’s Mining Act 1971 to section 499 and Allotment 11.

In 1980, the conservation park was described as follows: 
Small park surrounding Mount Monster, a granite inselberg of considerable geologic significance.  One of few blocks of remnant natural vegetation in the vicinity, it possesses vegetation elements unique in the area, including the rare Callitris rhomboidea and Prostanthera eurybioides.  Mount Monster represents the type locality and the only known South Australian outcrop of the Mount Monster quartz / feldspar / porphyry association…  

A granite outcrop possessing a gradation of vegetation types.  Rock and skeletal soils exhibit Acacia armata/Baeckea behrii shrubland association.  At the edge of the rock where deeper soils begin a dense Eucalyptus odorata/A. pycnantha scrub association is found.  Lower down over limestone ridges an open E. leucoxylon  forest over a scattered herbaceous layer is common.  As the soil becomes more sandy this grades into a low Woodland of E. fasciculosa /A. pycnantha and E. gracilis…  

General vegetation condition is good though small areas are degraded.  A small quarry adjacent to the park is of geological interest and would make a valuable addition to the park.  The summit itself is a trig point reserve…

Land within and around the conservation park's boundaries is known to be a site for Prostanthera eurybioides (Monarto Mintbush), a species of plant which is listed as endangered both by the National Parks and Wildlife Act 1972 and the Commonwealth Environment Protection and Biodiversity Conservation Act 1999.

As of 1992, it was reported that the conservation park was “used regularly by local residents for picnics, bushwalking and bird watching” and that it was “also a popular destination for bushwalkers and field naturalists.”

The conservation park is categorised as an IUCN Category VI protected area.  In 1980, it was listed on the now-defunct Register of the National Estate.

See also
Protected areas of South Australia

References

External links
Official webpage
Webpage for the Mount Monster Conservation Park on the Protected Planet website
 Friends of Mount Monster CP webpage on the Friends of the Parks website
Webpage on the BirdsSA website

Conservation parks of South Australia
Protected areas established in 1976
1976 establishments in Australia
South Australian places listed on the defunct Register of the National Estate
Limestone Coast